Living and Dying in ¾ Time is the fourth studio album by American popular-music singer and songwriter Jimmy Buffett and the second major-label album in Buffett's Don Gant-produced "Key West phase".  It was initially released in February 1974 as his second album for Dunhill. It contains the song "Come Monday", his first top-40 hit single.

Despite the title, not all the songs on the album are in  time signature.  The lyrics of "Nautical Wheelers" on Buffett's subsequent album, A1A, refer to "living and dying in ¾ time" and the song is also in  time.

Chart performance
The album was Buffett's first to chart on the Billboard 200 album chart, but it only reached number 176. Unlike A White Sport Coat and a Pink Crustacean before it, it failed to make the Billboard Top Country Albums chart.  The single of "Come Monday" reached number 30 on the Hot 100 and number three Easy Listening and number 58 Country.  In addition, "Pencil Thin Mustache" hit number 44 Easy Listening and "Saxophones" "bubbled under" the Hot 100 at number 105.

Songs
In addition to "Come Monday," the album contains "Pencil Thin Mustache", another Buffett concert favorite.  The two songs appear on most of his live albums and greatest hits compilations.

The album contains two cover songs: "Ballad of Spider John" written and originally performed by Willis Alan Ramsey and "God's Own Drunk" by Lord Buckley.  Buffett's version of "Ballad of Spider John" is missing some of the lyrics of the original, although he has included these in concert renditions.  "Livingston's Gone to Texas" is a remake of Buffett's own song that was originally recorded for High Cumberland Jubilee (recorded 1971, released 1976).  The version on Living and Dying in ¾ Time is a slower tempo, more country-sounding presentation, and is missing the penultimate verse of the original.

Track listing 
Side A:
"Pencil Thin Mustache" (Jimmy Buffett) – 2:47
"Come Monday" (Jimmy Buffett) – 3:06
"Ringling, Ringling" (Jimmy Buffett) – 2:32
"Brahma Fear" (Jimmy Buffett) – 4:05
"Brand New Country Star" (V. Arnold, Jimmy Buffett) – 2:40
"Livingston's Gone to Texas" (Jimmy Buffett) – 3:28
Side B:
"The Wino and I Know" (Jimmy Buffett) – 3:00
"West Nashville Grand Ballroom Gown" (Jimmy Buffett) – 2:34
"Saxophones" (Jimmy Buffett) – 3:18
"Ballad of Spider John" (Willis Alan Ramsey) – 4:26
"God's Own Drunk" (Lord Buckley) – 6:19

Performers
The Second Coral Reefer Band:
Jimmy Buffett – acoustic guitar
Reggie Young – electric guitar
Lanny Fiel – acoustic, electric, and slide guitar
Doyle Grisham – pedal steel guitar
Tommy Cogbill – bass
Mike Utley – keyboards
Sammy Creason – drums and bodyguard
Greg "Fingers" Taylor – harmonica
Ferrell Morris – congas, vibes, and other little goodies
Don Gant, Buzz Cason, Bergen White – background vocals
Bergen White – string and horn arrangements
Billy Puett – horns on "Saxophones"

Singles
"Saxophones" with "Ringling Ringling" (released on Dunhill D-4378 in January 1974)	
"Come Monday" with "The Wino And I Know" (released on Dunhill D-4385 in April 1974)
"Pencil Thin Mustache" with "Brand New Country Star" (released on Dunhill D-15011 in August 1974)

The single release of "Saxophones" was different from the album version, with an added horn section and background vocal section.

References

Jimmy Buffett albums
1974 albums
Albums produced by Don Gant
Dunhill Records albums